Vladimir Sergeevich Zhukov (born June 20, 1972), known as The Nizhegorodsky Chikatilo, is a Russian serial killer, rapist and pedophile.

Biography 
Zhukov was a radio engineer by trade, working in the Nizhny Novgorod branch of the Russian division as an international telephone operator. Due to the nature of his job, he often went on business trips to various cities in Russia. He was married, and he and his wife were raising a foster child.

Between 1999 and 2007, Zhukov abducted and raped girls aged between 7 and 12 years. In January 2003, he committed three rapes in Novosibirsk during a business trip, but this could not be proven due to none of the victims being located. In August 2004, he killed a 9-year-old boy and 12-year-old girl in the Bogorodsky District. On June 24, 2006, he kidnapped and killed a 9-year-old girl in the village of Voskresenskoye, throwing her body into a lake outside Nizhny Novgorod. In August 2007, he was arrested: one of his rape victims managed to memorize the car as well as the view from the window of Zhukov's apartment. After his detention, he confessed to 26, and then 32 total crimes committed in Nizhny Novgorod, Novosibirsk and Yaroslavl. He was investigated for involvement in similar crimes in other cities, where he traveled on business trips.

On September 15, 2008, the Nizhny Novgorod Regional Court found Vladimir Zhukov guilty of three murders and 11 rapes and sentenced him to life imprisonment. In addition, the court decided that the convicted should pay 2.8 million rubles in compensation to the victims' families. On April 28, 2009 he was sentenced by the Novosibirsk Regional Court to 11 years' imprisonment for 3 rapes committed in Novosibirsk in January 2003. This verdict was incorporated into the life imprisonment. It is suggested that Zhukov committed many more crimes in several regions in Russia.

He is serving his sentence in the White Swan prison. In September 2010, he confessed to the abduction of a girl of 8–10 years in 2002 in the city of Gorodets, followed by a rape and murder in the Koverninsky District.

See also
 List of Russian serial killers

References

External links 
 Moscow Komsomolets: In Nizhny Novgorod, a maniac with exemplary characteristics is judged
 newsru.com: Pedophilic "Chikatilo" from Nizhny Novgorod admitted to 26 crimes
 kommersant.ru: Pedophile-murderer is sentenced to life imprisonment
 ufa.kp.ru: "Komsomolskaya Pravda" found a touring pedophile maniac?

1972 births
Inmates of White Swan Prison
Living people
Male serial killers
People from Yaroslavl
Russian murderers of children
Russian people convicted of child sexual abuse
Russian rapists
Russian serial killers